Ammenabath is a village in the Ariyalur taluk of Ariyalur district, Tamil Nadu, India.

Demographics 

 census, Ammenabath had a total population of 526 with 258 males and 268 females.

References 

Villages in Ariyalur district